The ambassador of the United Kingdom to the Republic of El Salvador is the United Kingdom's foremost diplomatic representative in El Salvador, and in charge of the UK's diplomatic mission in San Salvador.

Until 1945, UK envoys to Guatemala were also accredited to El Salvador (see List of ambassadors of the United Kingdom to Guatemala). From 1982 to 1991, the embassy was a joint mission with Honduras and from 2003 to 2012 it was again combined with Guatemala. In mid-2012 the British Embassy in San Salvador was re-opened with a resident Ambassador.

List of heads of mission

Envoy Extraordinary and Minister Plenipotentiary
1945–1948: Norman Mayers
1948–1949: Harry Steptoe 
1949–1950: Daniel Brickell
1950–1953: Ralph Tottenham Smith 
1954–1956: Vyvyan Holt
1956: Frederick Everson

Ambassador Extraordinary and Plenipotentiary
1956–1960: Frederick Everson 
1960–1967: Geoffrey Kirk 
1967–1971: Michael Wenner
1971–1975: Donovan Clibborn 
1975–1977: Albert Hughes 
1977–1979: Achilles Papadopoulos
1982–1983: Colum Sharkey (non-resident) 
1984–1987: Bryan White (non-resident) 
1987–1989: David Joy (non-resident) 
1989–1991: Peter Streams (non-resident) 
1991–1995: Michael Connor
1995–1999: Ian Gerken
1999–2003: Patrick Morgan
2003–2006: Richard Lavers (non-resident) 
2006–2009: Ian Hughes (non-resident) 
2009–2012: Julie Chappell (non-resident) 
2012–2014: Linda Cross
2014–2015: Ned Holborn (chargé d'affaires) 

2015–: Bernhard Garside

External links
UK and El Salvador, gov.uk

References

El Salvador
 
United Kingdom Ambassadors